Actiniscus pentasterias is a species of dinoflagellate belonging to the family Actiniscaceae.

Synonym:
 Dictyocha pentasterias Ehrenberg (= basionym)

References

Gymnodiniales